Ferzende or Ferzende Beg (Kurdish: Ferzende Begê Hesenî, Turkish: Hasenanlı Ferzende Bey Muş - 1939; Qasr-e Qajar Prison, Tehran, Iran), was a Kurdish Heseni tribesman, soldier and politician.

Life

Sheikh Said Rebellion

Ferzende was born to mother Asiye and father Ahmed. He participated in Sheikh Said Rebellion and fought in the region of Malazgirt. After the failure of the rebellion, he went to Iran with 150 men. Persian government demanded their disarmament. But because Ferzende rejected it, the armed conflict broke out between Kurdish and Iranian forces. In this conflict Şemseddin, who is one of the sons of Halid of Hesenan, Ferzende's father Suleiman Ahmed, Kerem of Zirkan, Abdulbaki and others were killed by the Iranian force. He was wounded during the same combat action. Survivors took shelter to Simko Shikak.

Ararat Rebellion

In 1927, he returned to Turkey and participated in Ararat rebellion. He got involved in most of all battles and sabotage operations. In 1930, he was wounded during the Kurdish attack on Taşburun. After the failure of the rebellion, he passed the border and went to Iran.

Maku Rebellion
In 1931, a severe fighting in the vicinity of Maku between Persian troops and Kurds. The 2nd Brigade of Azerbaijan Division commanded by Colonel Mohammad Ali Khan engaged and Colonel Kalb-Ali Khan was sent from Tabriz and Ardabil with reinforcements. On 25 July, during the fighting in the vicinity of Qara Aineh, Persian Colonel Kalb Ali Khan was killed in action and Kurds lost three or four important leaders, including Ibrahim and his brother. Ferzende was wounded in this rebellion and after arrested by the Iranian security forces.

Death

In 1941, Osman Sabri wrote that Ferzende had been killed by poison in the prison at Khoy two years before. According to Zarife, who is the second wife of Nadir Süphandağ (one of the sons of Kor Hussein Pascha) and lived with Ferzende's wife Besra in the same house in Tehran for four years, Ferzende died in the Qasr-e Qajar Prison before they returned to Turkey in 1939.

Sources

Year of birth unknown
Kurdish people from the Ottoman Empire
Turkish Kurdish people
Iranian Kurdish people
1939 deaths
Turkish Kurdish politicians
Sheikh Said rebellion
Ararat rebellion
Kurdish nationalists
Iranian Kurdish politicians